Solpecainol is an anti-anginal and anti-arrhythmic agent.

References

Diols